The Suzuki TS50X is an air-cooled, single-cylinder, two-stroke engined, [[Types of motorcycles#Off-road|trail

 Trail style motorcycle manufactured by Suzuki from 1984 to 2000. It had a five-speed manual gearbox and complied with the United Kingdom requirements of the time to be classified as a moped. Electrics were 12 volt and capacitor discharge electronic ignition was used.The machine used Suzuki's own CCI oil pump delivery system, avoiding the need to pre-mix two-stroke engine oil.

The duplex cradle type frame, is made of welded tubular steel with a steel box-section swingarm. Front suspension is conventional coil-sprung telescopic, but the rear has Suzuki's "full-floater" type where the suspension is connected to the frame by a linkage, which allows spring rates to increase in response to wheel travel.

References

TS50X
Motorcycles introduced in 1984
Mopeds
Two-stroke motorcycles